German rock band Die Ärzte have released 14 studio albums, eight extended plays, seven compilation albums, six live albums, 11 video albums and 50 singles (of which the majority is accompanied by a music video). The band—consisting of members Farin Urlaub, Bela B and Rodrigo González—is one of the best-selling German groups with 7.8 million records sold in Germany.

Their work include German language songs such as "Schrei nach Liebe" (1993), "Ein Song namens Schunder" (1995), "Männer sind Schweine" (1998) and "Manchmal haben Frauen..." (2000), which experienced widespread commercial success in Germanic territories. Die Ärzte's albums, released by labels including CBS and Hot Action Records, received several Gold and Platinum certifications by the Bundesverband Musikindustrie (BVMI) in Germany and the International Federation of the Phonographic Industry (IFPI) in Austria and Switzerland in a span of almost 30 years.

Albums

Studio albums

Extended plays

Compilation albums

Live albums

Other albums

Singles

As lead artist

Videography

Video albums

Music videos

Notes

External links

References

Discography
Arzte, Die
Arzte, Die